In Greek mythology, Astymedusa (Astymédousa) or simply Medusa, was a Mycenaean princess as daughter of King Sthenelus and Nicippe, daughter of Pelops. 

She was occasionally named as a later wife of Oedipus. After parting with Jocasta or after the death of Euryganeia, who was his second wife, Oedipus married Astymedousa. Astymedusa accused Polynices and Eteocles of attempting to rape her, thus driving Oedipus into a frenzy. This is held as an alternate cause for the curse which led to the fraternal discord at the heart of the myth of the wars at Thebes.

Notes

References 

 Pausanias, Description of Greece with an English Translation by W.H.S. Jones, Litt.D., and H.A. Ormerod, M.A., in 4 Volumes. Cambridge, MA, Harvard University Press; London, William Heinemann Ltd. 1918. . Online version at the Perseus Digital Library
 Pausanias, Graeciae Descriptio. 3 vols. Leipzig, Teubner. 1903.  Greek text available at the Perseus Digital Library.

Bibliography
.

Princesses in Greek mythology
Queens in Greek mythology